Lions Stadium (also known as Corporate Travel Management Stadium for sponsorship reasons) is a soccer stadium located in Brisbane, Queensland, Australia. It has lights for night matches and can seat up to 5000 people.

It serves as the primary ground for the Queensland Lions in the National Premier League.

It also hosts the Brisbane Roar Women and the Brisbane Roar Academy teams.

References 

Soccer venues in Queensland
Sports venues in Brisbane
Queensland Lions